Amy Gutmann (born November 19, 1949) is an American academic and diplomat who is the United States Ambassador to Germany. She was the eighth president of the University of Pennsylvania. In November 2016, the school announced that her contract had been extended to 2022, which made her the longest-serving president in the history of the University of Pennsylvania. Gutmann resigned from her role as president on February 8, 2022, following her confirmation by the Senate as ambassador, after 18 years at the University.

In 2018, Fortune magazine named Gutmann one of the "World's 50 Greatest Leaders". She previously worked at Princeton as provost and Laurance S. Rockefeller University Professor of Politics. While there, she founded Princeton's ethics center, the University Center for Human Values. Her published works are in the fields of politics, ethics, education, and philosophy.

Early life and education
Amy Gutmann was born on November 19, 1949, in Brooklyn, New York, the only child of Kurt and Beatrice Gutmann. She was raised in Monroe, New York, a small town in the lower Hudson Valley.

Her father was the youngest of five children in an Orthodox Jewish family in Feuchtwangen, Germany. He was living near Nuremberg, Germany, when Adolf Hitler ascended to power. He fled Nazi Germany in 1934 as a college student. He brought his entire family, including four siblings, to join him in Bombay, India, where he founded a metal fabricating factory. Kurt Gutmann was still living in India in 1948 when he came to New York City for vacation. While there he attended a benefit at a Manhattan hotel, Essex House, where he met Beatrice, Amy's future mother, and the two were married weeks later.
Gutmann told Adam Bryant of The New York Times in June 2011:

Gutmann graduated from Monroe-Woodbury High School in Monroe, New York. She then entered Radcliffe College of Harvard University in 1967 on a scholarship as a math major with sophomore standing. She received membership in Phi Beta Kappa and her Bachelor of Arts degree magna cum laude from Radcliffe College in 1971, followed by a Master of Science degree in political science from the London School of Economics in 1972, and a Doctor of Philosophy degree in political science from Harvard University in 1976. She was the first in her family to graduate from college.

Career

Princeton University 

Gutmann taught at Princeton University from 1976 to 2004. In 1990, she became the first Laurance S. Rockefeller University Professor at Princeton and the founding director of its University Center for Human Values, among the first and best-endowed university-wide multi-disciplinary ethics centers in the world. As provost at Princeton University from 2001 to 2004, she oversaw Princeton's plan to expand the undergraduate student body by 10 percent and spearheaded the recruitment from Harvard of star professor K. Anthony Appiah (co-author with Gutmann of Color Conscious: The Political Morality of Race).

University of Pennsylvania
In her 2004 inaugural address Gutmann launched the Penn Compact, her vision for making Penn both a global leader in teaching, research, and professional practice; and a dynamic agent of social, economic, and civic progress.

In 2017 she renewed and updated her vision with the Penn Compact 2022, recommitting the university to these ideals and outlining the next steps: First, to increase inclusion at the university with increases in faculty and student diversity. Second, to integrate knowledge across academic disciplines with a strong emphasis on innovation: Penn was named No. 4 in Reuters' Top 100 World Innovative Universities in 2017, 2018, and 2019, and the university is consistently helping to facilitate commercialization agreements, ringing in over 650 in 2017 (up from fewer than 50 just a decade prior). Another highlight in innovation is Penn's biomedical research and clinical breakthroughs, approved by the FDA to treat cancer using a patient's own immune system. The Wall Street Journal noted that "Today the university [Penn] lays claim to having incubated the world's biggest cancer breakthrough." In addition, it is Penn Medicine researchers who developed the mRNA vaccine technology that is a critical component of Pfizer/BioNTech's and Moderna's COVID-19 vaccines, which are being deployed globally in the fight against COVID-19. A third priority through the Compact is to have an impact locally, nationally, and globally to bring the benefits of Penn's research, teaching, and service to individuals and communities at home and around the world. This is recently illustrated by the University's $100 million commitment to the Philadelphia School District to remediate environmental hazards—the largest private contribution to the School District in its history.

Fundraising and scholarships
As president, Gutmann has overseen Penn's largest fundraising campaign ever, Power of Penn, which concluded in 2021 with a total of $5.4 billion and included priorities such as a "Penn First Plus" initiative, targeted to support first-generation, low-income students. She previously led the Making History campaign, launched in 2007, which raised a record $4.3 billion, exceeding its goal by more than $800 million. It achieved its $3.5-billion target 16 months ahead of its December 31, 2012, conclusion. It was an unusually broad-based campaign, attracting gifts from nearly 327,000 donors. Gutmann is the only Penn president to lead two fundraising campaigns, and since 2004 she has helped raise over $10 billion for Penn.

Gutmann has been a leading national advocate for financial aid based on need to promote socioeconomic diversity in higher education. Gutmann made Penn one of the handful of universities in the country that substitute grants for loans for any undergraduate student with financial need. In September 2009, for the first time in Penn's history, all undergraduates eligible for financial aid received grants rather than loans in their aid packages. Students from typical families with income less than $40,000 paid no tuition, fees, room or board. Students from typical families with incomes less than $90,000 paid no tuition and fees. In 2017, one out of eight incoming Penn students were the first in their families to attend college, up from one out of 20 in 2004. She and her husband Michael Doyle have also funded an endowed undergraduate scholarship and an undergraduate research fund at Penn. In 2017, they committed an additional more than $1 million for scholarships, supporting multiple students and matching funds for other donors. In 2020, Gutmann and Doyle donated $2 million to Penn's nursing school to establish leadership scholarships for undergraduates and graduates who are passionate about making lasting impact in underserved urban and rural communities.

In 2014, Gutmann announced Penn Compact 2020 initiatives to create up to 50 new endowed professorships utilizing matching donor funds, and to raise an additional $240 million for undergraduate financial aid on top of the $360 million raised for undergraduate aid during the Making History campaign. Additionally, Gutmann announced unique and unprecedented awards for undergraduate students "with the most promising plans to improve local, national, or global conditions in the year after their graduation".

In March 2015, Gutmann announced the selection of five students (four projects) as winners of Penn's inaugural President's Engagement Prize. The largest of their kind in higher education, the President's Engagement Prizes provide up to $150,000 annually for graduating seniors to design and implement impactful local, national, and global engagement projects. In its coverage of the first awards, The Philadelphia Inquirer stated, "Penn grads win chance to change the world." In October 2015, she announced Penn's President's Innovation Prize, a corollary to the Engagement Prize that is focused on commercial ventures; the first winners were announced in April 2016. Shadrack Frimpong, a 2015 alumnus, used his President's Engagement Prize to start a school for girls, many of whom did not have access to education. Frimpong returned to Penn in 2018 to complete a degree in non-profit leadership and management at Penn to continue his work.

Campus development
Since arriving at Penn, Gutmann has also spearheaded a major campus development plan, Penn Connects, that includes  that Penn purchased from the US Postal Service along the Schuylkill River, which opened as Penn Park in September 2011. Penn Connects is designed to boost the economic, educational and social capacity of Philadelphia and to create seamless gateways between West Philadelphia and Center City across the Schuylkill River.

Penn began an expansion east of the Schuylkill River with the purchase of the DuPont Marshall Laboratory in September 2010. Gutmann said that the Marshall Lab property has "infinite possibilities" as a place to nurture startups and "technology transfer", where faculty with "great discoveries can attract venture capital" and bring ideas to market.

In Fall 2016, Penn opened its Pennovation Center, the anchor of a 23-acre site that the university has dubbed Pennovation Works, on a Grays Ferry site along the south bank of the Schuylkill which was once home to the DuPont Co.'s Marshall Labs (where workers discovered the substance that led to the development of Teflon). The $35-million project is about 1 1/2 miles from the center of Penn's West Philadelphia campus. A large, red-letter sign reads "Pennovation" over the three-story, 58,000-square foot facility. Pennovation includes an addition that resembles a crystal formation, representing the "crystallization of ideas", and architecture critic Inga Saffron says that its unique design "announces the future", rather than harkening back to the past. Johnson & Johnson announced in July 2018 that Pennovation Works would house J&J's first US-based JPOD, a networking hub that seeks to connect J&J researchers and the local life sciences community. With the announcement, J&J joined the ranks of global telecom giant Qualcomm and chocolate maker Hershey's, which also selected Pennovation Works to open Philadelphia operations.

Protests on campus
On December 8, 2014, The Daily Pennsylvanian reported that student protesters concerned about the death of Michael Brown in Ferguson, Missouri, disrupted a holiday party for students at Gutmann's home. As a gesture of support for the students' cause, Gutmann joined them in lying on the ground to symbolize the four-and-a-half hours that Brown's body was left lying on the street in Ferguson after his death. Members of the Penn police force publicly responded to the show of support, with the head of the police union writing a public letter criticizing the move and the chief of the police department responding with a letter defending Gutmann's actions.

Tenure as president
On May 8, 2012, Penn announced that Gutmann's contract had been renewed through 2019. In announcing the extension, David L. Cohen, chair of Penn's Board of Trustees, stated that Penn's "Trustees feel very strongly that Amy Gutmann is simply the best university president in the country. Under her superb leadership, Penn is a stronger and more vibrant institution than at any time in its storied history." In November 2016 Cohen, still Board Chairman, announced that Gutmann's contract would be extended until 2022, making her the longest-serving president ever at Penn.

In 2017, Gutmann's total compensation was $2.9 million, making her the highest paid private college president in Pennsylvania and fourth highest in the United States.

United States Ambassador to Germany

On July 2, 2021, President Joe Biden nominated her to serve as the United States Ambassador to Germany. Hearings on her nomination were held before the Senate Foreign Relations Committee on December 14, 2021. Her nomination expired at the end of the year and was returned to President Biden on January 3, 2022.

President Biden renominated Gutmann the next day. The committee favorably reported her nomination to the Senate floor on January 12, 2022. On February 8, 2022, the United States Senate confirmed her nomination by a 54-42 vote. She presented her credentials on February 17, 2022.

Scholarly career
Through her writings, Gutmann has consistently sought to bridge theory and policy to advance the core values of a civil democratic society: liberty, opportunity and mutual respect. In a recent ranking of US political scientists in PhD-granting departments, she is ranked second-highest in citations among all political theorists, eighth-highest among all women political scientists, and has been cited more than any other political scientist at the University of Pennsylvania.

Her first major contribution to political philosophy was her book Democratic Education (1987; revised 1999). The book addresses the central questions in the political theory of education: How should a democratic society make decisions about education? What should children be taught? How should citizens be educated? It was reviewed in Ethics as "the finest contribution to the literature on democratic education of the last seventy years" and fostered a revival of interest in the relationship between democracy and education. The book also takes on some contemporary scholarly debates: What is the appropriate response of democratic education to the challenge of multiculturalism? Should schools try to cultivate patriotic or cosmopolitan sentiments among students?

Gutmann's second major contribution to political philosophy is a theory of deliberative democracy that she developed in collaboration with Harvard political scientist Dennis Thompson. Democracy and Disagreement (1996) calls for more reasoned and respectful argument in everyday politics. Deliberation can inform decision making through reasoned argument and develop society's collective capacity to pursue justice while finding mutually acceptable terms of social cooperation—even when disagreements persist.

Democracy and Disagreement has been praised as an effective remedy for polarized politics and criticized as impractical, as evidenced in a collection of pro and con essays published in Deliberative Politics, edited by Stephen Macedo. Defenders argue that more and better political deliberation can help all citizens. In her work Gutmann has applied the ideas of deliberative democracy to the US electoral process, President Barack Obama's Commission for the Study of Bioethical Issues, the South African Truth and Reconciliation Commission, and healthcare organization in the United Kingdom.

Gutmann's third major contribution to political philosophy is her analysis of group identity and its intersection with justice. In Identity in Democracy (2003), Gutmann argues that identity groups as such are neither friends nor enemies of democratic justice. She analyzes the legitimate but also problematic parts played by group identity in democratic politics and draws distinctions among the various types of identity group politics. She further developed this perspective in her nationally recognized 2018 Penn Commencement speech, "Think Uniquely, Stand United," in which she said that ". . . what makes us unique and what unites us are not starkly opposed. Uniqueness and unity are the twin pillars of a strong pluralism. We thrive when we combine unity of shared values with our unique perspectives on life. It has never been more important that we think uniquely while we stand united."

In May 2012, Gutmann published her 16th book, The Spirit of Compromise: Why Governing Demands It and Campaigning Undermines It (Princeton University Press), with co-author Dennis Thompson of Harvard. The authors posit that the difficulty of compromise is built into the democratic process itself, but so is the need for it. A better understanding and appreciation of compromise might be especially useful in this time of political polarization. Paul Starr of The New Republic said The Spirit:

Provide[s] grist for thinking through the difficulties of compromise in [domestic policy], from tragic choices at desperate moments of history to the routine nastiness in American public life today... Until recently, who would have thought it necessary to offer Americans advice in the ways of compromise? We used to enjoy a reputation for being a practical-minded people, our politicians being regarded as an all-too-flexible species. But something has changed, and according to Gutmann and Thompson, the change has to do with the relation of campaigning and governing... Gutmann and Thompson end their book with recommendations to strengthen the spirit and practice of compromise."

Judy Woodruff of the PBS Newshour called the book "a clear-eyed examination of the forces that bring warring political leaders together or keep them apart. I wish every policymaker would read it".

Gutmann's 17th book, co-authored with Jonathan Moreno, Everybody Wants to Go to Heaven, but Nobody Wants to Die, was published in 2019 by W. W. Norton & Company.

Board and leadership positions

In 2009, Barack Obama appointed Gutmann chair of the Presidential Commission for the Study of Bioethical Issues, and reappointed her in early 2012, a position she held through 2016. The Bioethics Commission issued 10 reports on a variety of issues including protections for adult and pediatric participants in medical research, and the ethics of genomics and neuroscience. The Commission's meetings were open to the public and streamed live—and all its recommendations to the President were unanimous. Its capstone report, Bioethics for Every Generation, focused on the mission of bioethics commissions in advancing democratic deliberation and bioethics education.

From 2005 to 2009, Gutmann served on the National Security Higher Education Advisory Board, a committee that advises the FBI on national security issues relating to academia. From 2011 to 2013 she was a member of the National Commission on the Humanities and Social Sciences, which was convened by the American Academy of Arts and Sciences. In 2014, the Association of American Universities elected Gutmann as chair of its board of directors for a one-year term. From 2007 to 2019 Gutmann served on the board of the National Constitution Center in Philadelphia. She was a member of the Knight Commission on Trust, Media and Democracy from 2017 to 2019. From 2006 to 2022, Gutmann served on the board of The Vanguard Group, and was a member of the board of directors of the Berggruen Institute from 2014 to 2022.

Gutmann is a member of the Global University Leaders Forum (GULF), which convenes at the World Economic Forum in Davos, Switzerland.

Personal life
Gutmann is married to Michael Doyle, professor of law and international affairs at Columbia University. They have one daughter, Abigail Doyle, a Professor of Chemistry at UCLA where she holds the Saul Winstein Chair in Organic Chemistry.

Awards and honors
Honorary Doctor of Laws Degree, Kalamazoo College, 1992
The Centennial Medal, Harvard University, 2003
Elected a Member of the American Philosophical Society, 2005
Honorary Doctor of Laws Degree, University of Rochester, 2005
Honorary Doctor of Letter Degree, Wesleyan University, 2005
 Named a Distinguished Daughter of Pennsylvania, 2010
 Honorary Doctor of Laws Degree, Columbia University, 2012
 Woman of Spirit Award, National Multiple Sclerosis Society, 2012
 Honorary Fellow, London School of Economics, 2013
 Americanism Award, Anti-Defamation League, 2014
 Reginald Wilson Diversity Leadership Award, American Council on Education, 2015
 Lucretia Mott Award, Women's Way, 2017  
 Honorary Doctor of Humane Letters Degree, Johns Hopkins University, 2017 
William Penn Award, The Chamber of Commerce for Greater Philadelphia, 2018 
Philadelphia Inquirer Industry Icon Award, Philadelphia Media Network, 2018 
Eugene M. Lang Lifetime Achievement Award, "I Have a Dream" Foundation, 2018 
 Named one of Fortune Magazine "World's 50 Greatest Leaders", 2018 
Gold Medal for Distinguished Achievement, Pennsylvania Society, 2019 
Leo Baeck Medal, 2022
New College House named for President Emerita Amy Gutmann, 2022
Honorary Doctor of Laws Degree, Princeton University, 2022 
Honorary Doctor of Laws Degree, University of Pennsylvania, 2022

Selected works

 "Everybody Wants to Go to Heaven but Nobody Wants to Die: Bioethics and the Transformation of Health Care in America" (with Jonathan D. Moreno). Liveright Publishing Corporation, 2019.
"Liberalism," International Encyclopedia of Social and Behavioral Sciences, 2001.
"The Moral Foundation of Truth Commissions," with Dennis Thompson, in Robert Rotberg and Dennis Thompson, eds., Truth vs. Justice, Princeton University Press, 2000.
The Spirit of Compromise: Why Governing Demands It and Campaigning Undermines It with Dennis Thompson, Princeton University Press, Princeton, N.J., 2012
Why Deliberative Democracy? with Dennis Thompson, Princeton University Press, Princeton, N.J., 2004
Identity in Democracy, Princeton University Press, Princeton, N.J., 2003 (Trad. esp.: La identidad en Democracia, Buenos Aires/Madrid, Katz editores S.A, 2008)
Color Conscious: The Political Morality of Race, with Anthony Appiah, Princeton, N.J.: Princeton University Press, 1996
Democracy and Disagreement, with Dennis Thompson, Cambridge, Mass.: Belknap Press of Harvard University Press, 1996
Democratic Education, Princeton, N.J.: Princeton University Press, 1987
Ethics and Politics: Cases and Comments, with Dennis Thompson, Chicago, Ill.: Nelson-Hall, 1984
 
Liberal Equality, New York and London: Cambridge University Press, 1980

References

External links

Ambassador Amy Gutmann | U.S. Mission Germany 

Amy Gutmann Curriculum Vitae | University of Pennsylvania (archived)

1949 births
Living people
21st-century American Jews
21st-century American women
Alumni of the London School of Economics
Ambassadors of the United States to Germany
American people of German-Jewish descent
American political philosophers
American women political scientists
American political scientists
American women academics
Chief Administrators of the University of Pennsylvania
Democratic education
Hastings Center Fellows
Jewish American academics
Jewish philosophers
Members of the American Philosophical Society
People from Brooklyn
People from Monroe, New York
Political philosophers
Princeton University faculty
Radcliffe College alumni
University of Pennsylvania faculty
Christopher H. Browne Distinguished Professor
Women heads of universities and colleges
American women diplomats